is a champion Japanese thoroughbred racehorse, which is most notable for winning the 2010 Takarazuka Kinen and running second to Workforce in the 2010 Prix de l'Arc de Triomphe.

Pedigree
Nakayama Festa was sired by the 2001 Hong Kong Vase winner Stay Gold, who was in turn sired by the influential American-bred sire Sunday Silence. Nakayama Festa's dam, Dear Wink, was sired by the American stallion Tight Spot, which was a Grade 1 stakes winner in the United States and has since been exported to China for stud services.

Racing career
Nakayama Festa won the Nisai Stakes as a two-year-old, which was his only placing in 2008. He only won one race (St Lite Kinen) as a 3-year old and placed in the 2009 Keisei Hai. Nakayama Festa won the 2010 Takarazuka Kinen in Japan by beating two-time champion filly Buena Vista.  He also finished second at the 2010 Prix Foy and Prix de l'Arc de Triomphe in France. Nakayama Festa ran in two races in 2011. He finished in last place out of a field of four horses at the Prix Foy run at Longchamp Racecourse in France, the race ultimately being won by the French horse Sarafina. In the final start of his career on 2 October 2011 at the same course, Nakayama Festa finished in 11th place out of a field of 16 horses in the Prix de l'Arc de Triomphe, which was won by Danedream.

Stud career
Nakayama Festa was retired from racing in October 2011 to stand in Hidaka Cho for the 2012 breeding season. On the decision to retire Nakayam Festa, his trainer Yoshitaka Ninomiya remarked, "He doesn't have any injuries but we thought it was better for him to retire when his condition was good."

References

2006 racehorse births
Racehorses bred in Japan
Racehorses trained in Japan
Thoroughbred family 3-h